The Intervision Song Contest 1977 was the debut edition of the Intervision Song Contest held between the 24–27 August 1977 in the Forest Opera, a venue located in the Polish city of Sopot.

Location 

The Forest Opera is an open-air amphitheatre located in Sopot, Poland, with a capacity of 4400 seats, the orchestra pit can contain up to 110 musicians.  Each year, starting from 1964 (with some interruption in the early 1980s), the Sopot International Song Festival took place at the Forest Opera, events being organized by the Ministry of Culture and Art in cooperation with the Polish Artistic Agency (PAGART). The Forest Opera played host to the first Intervision Song Contest, between 24 and 27 August 1977.

Participants
The following countries confirmed their participation in the first edition of the contest:

References

1977 in music
1977 in radio
1977 in Polish television
1977